Princess Luna may refer to:

 Princess Luna (My Little Pony), a character in My Little Pony: Friendship is Magic
 Princess Luna (Peter Pan), a protagonist in The Adventures of Peter Pan